Deborah Geels is a diplomat from New Zealand. In 2013 she was appointed Permanent Representative to the United Nations in Vienna. She is currently based at Ministry of Foreign Affairs and Trade in Wellington.

Early life and education 
Geels was born in Timaru and attended Sacred Heart Primary School and Mercy College. She then moved to Christchurch to study international politics and economics at the University of Canterbury.

Career 
In 1986 Geels joined the Ministry of Foreign Affairs and Trade to work on New Zealand's aid programme, and later moved into a diplomacy role. From 1993 to 1995 she was posted to Vanuatu, and from 1997 to 2002 she served at the New Zealand Permanent Mission to the United Nations in Geneva. From 2006 to 2008 Geels was Deputy Head of Mission to Beijing, China.

In 2013 she was appointed Ambassador to Austria, Hungary, Slovakia and Slovenia, and Permanent Representative to the UN and Other International Organisations in Vienna.

References

Living people
People from Timaru
University of Canterbury alumni
New Zealand women ambassadors
Permanent Representatives of New Zealand to the United Nations
Ambassadors of New Zealand to Austria
Year of birth missing (living people)
People educated at Roncalli College